The Idaho Falls Chukars are an independent baseball team of the Pioneer League, which is not affiliated with Major League Baseball (MLB) but is an MLB Partner League. They are located in Idaho Falls, Idaho, and play their home games at Melaleuca Field.

They adopted the name the Chukars following a fan vote when the major league affiliation changed after the 2003 season. A chukar is a game bird found in the region. The Chukars are the only professional sports team in Eastern Idaho.

In conjunction with a contraction of Minor League Baseball in 2021, the Pioneer League, of which the Chukars have been members since 1940, was converted from an MLB-affiliated Rookie Advanced league to an independent baseball league and granted status as an MLB Partner League, with Idaho Falls continuing as members.

Franchise history
After fielding the Idaho Falls Spuds in the Utah–Idaho League from 1926 to 1928, the franchise restarted in 1940 and were called the Russets, playing in the Pioneer League. The team has played each season since then, under various major league affiliations and nicknames, except for three years that the Pioneer League suspended operation due to World War II. Some famous baseball alumni of Idaho Falls teams are Billy Martin, Joe Maddon, Jose Canseco, Mike Moustakas, Eric Hosmer and Billy Butler. The Chukars are the only professional sports team in Eastern Idaho. More than one million fans have attended Idaho Falls home games since the team moved into Melaleuca Field in 2007.

Roster

Broadcasting
All exhibition, regular season and postseason games can be heard on KSPZ (Fox Sports Radio affiliate) 980 AM - 98.7 FM throughout Eastern Idaho in Idaho Falls and Pocatello. The signal also reaches part of Western Wyoming. John Balginy has been the "Voice of the Chukars" since 1985. For 2021, Tyler Petersen is the Director of Broadcasting & Media Relations, serving as the solo play-by-play voice for all road games and working in the booth with Balginy for all home games.

Notable alumni

Numerous Idaho Falls alumni advanced to Major League baseball, some alumni of note include:

 Raul Mondesi (2012)
 Danny Duffy (2010)
 Wil Myers (2009) 2013 AL Rookie of the Year
 Eric Hosmer (2008) MLB All-Star
 Salvador Pérez (2008–09) 3 × GG; 3 × MLB All-Star; 2015 World Series MVP
 Greg Holland (2007) 2 × MLB All-Star
 Mike Moustakas (2007) MLB All-Star
 Billy Butler (2004) MLB All-Star
 Carlos Lezcano (2003, MGR)
 José Lobatón (2003)
 Óliver Pérez (2000) 
 Jake Peavy (1999)  3 × MLB All-Star; 2007 NL wins Leader; 2× MLB ERA leader (2004, 2007); 2007 NL Cy Young Award
 Rick Sutcliffe (Pitching coach: 1996-1997) 3 x MLB All-Star, 1984 NL Cy Young Award, 1979 NL Rookie of the Year, ESPN Broadcaster
 Shawn Camp (1997)
 Matt Clement (1995) MLB All-Star
 Ben Davis (1995)
 Dave Hilton (1992, MGR)
 Cloyd Boyer (1989, MGR)
 Kevin Brown (1986) 6 × MLB All-Star; 2 × NL ERA Leader (1996, 2000)
 Rod Gilbreath (1986–87, MGR)
 Al Martin (1986) 
 Jim Nettles (1984 MGR)
 Félix José (1984) MLB AS
 Jose Canseco (1982) 6 × MLB All-Star; 2 × MLB home run leader (1988, 1991); 1986 AL Rookie of the Year; 1988 AL Most Valuable Player
 Dick Schofield (1981)
 Devon White (1981) 7 × GG; 3 × MLB All-Star
 Joe Maddon (1981, MGR) 3 × MLB Manager of the Year (2008, 2011, 2015); MGR: 2016 World Series Champion — Chicago Cubs
 Gary Pettis (1979) 5 × GG
 Tom Brunansky (1978) MLB All-Star
 Mike Witt (1978) 2 × MLB All-Star; Perfect Game: 9/30/1984
 Richard Dotson (1977) MLB All-Star
 Keith Comstock (1976)
 Bobby Clark (1975)
 Mark Clear (1975) 2 × MLB All-Star
 Carney Lansford (1975) MLB All-Star; 1981 AL Batting Title
 Thad Bosley (1974)
 Julio Cruz (1974) 
 Larry Himes (1974–77, MGR) 
 Rance Mulliniks (1974)
 Dave Collins (1972)
 Ron Jackson (1971)
 Dan Briggs (1970–71)
 Dick Lange (1970)
 Sid Monge (1970) MLB AS
 Morris Nettles (1970)
 Rudy Meoli (1969)
 Norm Sherry (1969, MGR)
 Lloyd Allen (1968)
 Doug Griffin (1965) 
 Tom Egan (1964)
 Marty Perez (1964–65)
 Frank Fernández (1963)
 Steve Whitaker (1962–63)
 Jim Shellenback (1962)
 Tommy McCraw (1961) 
 Jerry McNertney (1961)
 Bob Locker (1960) 
 Jim Hicks (1960–61)
 Peanuts Lowrey (1960, MGR) MLB All-Star
 Fred Talbot (1960)
 Donn Clendenon (1959) 1969 World Series MVP
 Jim Campbell (1959)
 Jake Wood (1958) 
 Buck Rodgers (1958) MLB Player; MLB MGR; 1987 NL Manager of the Year
 Bob Johnson (1956)
 Charlie Metro (1956, MGR) 
 Ken Rowe (1955) 
 Pat Mullin (1955, Player/MGR) 2 × MLB AS; 
 Bubba Morton (1955) 
 Cuno Barragan (1953) Inducted Mexican American Hall of Fame
 John Briggs (1952–53)
Billy Martin (1946) MLB All-Star; MGR: 1977 World Series Champion—New York Yankees
 Bill Wight (1941) 
 Clancy Smyres (1941) MLB autograph is more valuable than Babe Ruth
 Elmer Singleton (1941)
 Doc Marshall (1941)
 Woody Main (1941)
 Ed Bahr (1940)
 Ed Coleman (1927)

References

External links
Official Idaho Falls Chukars website
Official website of Melaleuca Field, Home of the Chukars

Baseball teams established in 1940
Pioneer League (baseball) teams
Idaho Falls, Idaho
Professional baseball teams in Idaho
Kansas City Royals minor league affiliates
San Diego Padres minor league affiliates
Atlanta Braves minor league affiliates
Oakland Athletics minor league affiliates
California Angels minor league affiliates
Chicago White Sox minor league affiliates
Pittsburgh Pirates minor league affiliates
Detroit Tigers minor league affiliates
New York Giants minor league affiliates
Brooklyn Dodgers minor league affiliates
New York Yankees minor league affiliates
1940 establishments in Idaho